Kidd Springs is a neighborhood in the North Oak Cliff area of Dallas, Texas (USA). The neighborhood is named after Colonel James W. Kidd Sr., who purchased land in the area in the 1870s adjoining a natural spring.

The Kidd Springs Neighborhood is roughly bounded by Zang Boulevard on the East, Tyler Street on the West, Colorado Boulevard on the North, and West Davis Street (SH 180) on the South. Within the boundaries of Kidd Springs is Miller and Stemmons Historic District which is listed on the National Register of Historic Places.

Kidd Springs Park
Kidd Springs Park had its beginning as a private park in 1895 when the Kidd Springs Fishing & Boating Club began constructing the small spring-fed lake. By the turn of the 20th Century, the site contained an upscale country club for the elite to socialize.

The park became part of the Dallas Parks and Recreation system in 1947. A recreation center was built in 1965.

In 2017, the Dallas city council approved a $1 million renovation budget for the Japanese garden in the park.

References